Geng Chong, born in Xianyang, Shaanxi, was a general during the Battle of Yiwulu in 73, he is a nephew of Geng Kui.

Han dynasty generals
1st-century Chinese people